Z-1 was a Japanese idol quartet signed under Toshiba EMI from 1999 to 2002. The name Z-1 signifies the last (Z) super stars of the 20th century and the first (1) of the 21st.

Members
, born on September 14, 1985 in Tokyo.
, born on October 25, 1985, in Tokyo.
, born on May 26, 1983, in Kanagawa Prefecture.
, born on October 20, 1984, in Saitama Prefecture

Biography
In July 1998, Ueto (special prize winner), Nejiki (musical prize winner), Nishikawa and Fujiya were selected out of the participants of the talent agency Oscar Promotion's 7th All-Japan National Young Beauty contest to form Z-1.

In 1999, the four landed a regular spot on the Fuji TV variety program "Kaishingeki TV Utaemon". They made one of their first appearances at a PR event for the Japanese dub of Pixar's "A Bug's Life". They debuted in July of the same year with the single "Vibe!", released in four versions, each carrying a different remix of the title track.

In 2000, the song "Bakka Mitai!!" ((It's) So Stupid) was banned from airing on NHK due to its mildly vulgar title.

In 2002, after five singles the group disbanded. Ueto went on to pursue a solo career, as well as becoming one of Japan's most prolific young actresses. Nejiki debuted as a solo artist in 2004 while Fujiya enjoyed a short-lived modeling career. Nishikawa is currently a member of the indies rock band "Tarock".

In 2003, Ueto's success as a solo artist prompted Toshiba EMI to release compilation album of all the Z-1 material.

Discography

Singles

Albums

TV
Kaishingeki TV Utaemon (Fuji TV, 1999)
The Yoru mo Hit Parade (NTV, 1999)

Commercials
Toshiba "Alkaline Battery 1"
Three F
Yomiuri Shimbun magazine "ZipZap"

External links
 Yappa Z-1 Desho! (fansite)

Aya Ueto
Japanese pop music groups
Japanese girl groups
Japanese idol groups
Musical groups from Tokyo